is a Japanese football player currently playing for FC TIAMO Hirakata.

Club team career statistics
Updated to 23 February 2020.

References

External links

Profile at Giravanz Kitakyushu

1989 births
Living people
Hannan University alumni
Association football people from Ehime Prefecture
Japanese footballers
J1 League players
J2 League players
J3 League players
Cerezo Osaka players
Giravanz Kitakyushu players
FC Tiamo Hirakata players
Association football midfielders